Piano Sonata No. 21 may refer to:
Piano Sonata No. 21 (Beethoven)
Piano Sonata No. 21 (Schubert)